June 8 - Eastern Orthodox Church calendar - June 10

All fixed commemorations below celebrated on June 22 by Orthodox Churches on the Old Calendar.

For June 9th, Orthodox Churches on the Old Calendar commemorate the Saints listed on May 27.

Saints
 Martyr Ananias, by the sword.
 Martyrs Diomedes, Orestes and Rodon.
 Nun-martyrs Thecla, Mariamne, Martha, Mary, and Enmatha, in Persia, by beheading (346)
 Saint Cyril of Alexandria, Archbishop of Alexandria (444)  (see also: January 18 )
 Venerable Julian, ascetic in Syria (370)
 Hieromartyr Alexander, Bishop of Prusa.
 Holy Three Virgin-Martyrs of Chios, by the sword.
 Venerable Cyrus, monk, reposed in peace.

Pre-Schism Western saints
 Saint Vincent of Agen, a deacon martyred by pagans at Agen in Gascony in France (c. 292)
 Martyrs Primus and Felician, two elderly brothers beheaded under Diocletian on the Via Nomentana in Rome (c. 297)
 Venerable Maximian of Syracuse (O.S.B.), Bishop of Syracuse (594)
 Venerable Columba of Iona, Enlightener of Caledonia (Scotland), founder of Iona Abbey, Confessor (597)
 Venerable Baithéne mac Brénaind (Baithin, Comin, Cominus), disciple of St. Columba, Abbot, of Tiree and Iona (c. 600)
 Saint Cumianus (Cumian, Cummin), an Irish monk who became abbot of San Colombano di Bobbio (c. 736)

Post-Schism Orthodox saints
 Saint John of Shavta, Bishop of Gaenati (12th-13th century)  (see also: April 1 )
 Venerable Cyril of White Lake, founder of White Lake (Belozersk) Monastery (1427)
 Venerable Alexander of Kushta, founder of the Kushta Monastery, Vologda (1439)
 Righteous Cyril of Velsk (or Vazhe), Vologda, Wonderworker (15th century)
 Saint Alexis Mechev, Archpriest, of Moscow (1923)

Other commemorations
 Repose of Hieromonk Vitaly of Valaam Monastery (1856)
 Uncovering of the relics (2005) of Saint Raphael (Sheychenko), monk of Old Agapia Monastery, Moldavia (1957)

Icon gallery

Notes

References

Sources
 June 9/22. Orthodox Calendar (PRAVOSLAVIE.RU).
 June 22 / June 9. HOLY TRINITY RUSSIAN ORTHODOX CHURCH (A parish of the Patriarchate of Moscow).
 June 9. OCA - The Lives of the Saints.
 The Autonomous Orthodox Metropolia of Western Europe and the Americas (ROCOR). St. Hilarion Calendar of Saints for the year of our Lord 2004. St. Hilarion Press (Austin, TX). p. 42.
 The Ninth Day of the Month of June. Orthodoxy in China.
 June 9. Latin Saints of the Orthodox Patriarchate of Rome.
 The Roman Martyrology. Transl. by the Archbishop of Baltimore. Last Edition, According to the Copy Printed at Rome in 1914. Revised Edition, with the Imprimatur of His Eminence Cardinal Gibbons. Baltimore: John Murphy Company, 1916. p. 168.
 Rev. Richard Stanton. A Menology of England and Wales, or, Brief Memorials of the Ancient British and English Saints Arranged According to the Calendar, Together with the Martyrs of the 16th and 17th Centuries. London: Burns & Oates, 1892. pp. 263–264.
Greek Sources
 Great Synaxaristes:  9 ΙΟΥΝΙΟΥ. ΜΕΓΑΣ ΣΥΝΑΞΑΡΙΣΤΗΣ.
  Συναξαριστής. 9 Ιουνίου. ECCLESIA.GR. (H ΕΚΚΛΗΣΙΑ ΤΗΣ ΕΛΛΑΔΟΣ). 
  09/06/2017. Ορθόδοξος Συναξαριστής. 
Russian Sources
  22 июня (9 июня). Православная Энциклопедия под редакцией Патриарха Московского и всея Руси Кирилла (электронная версия). (Orthodox Encyclopedia - Pravenc.ru).
  9 июня по старому стилю / 22 июня по новому стилю. Русская Православная Церковь - Православный церковный календарь на 2017 год.
  9 июня (ст.ст.) 22 июня 2014 (нов. ст.). Русская Православная Церковь Отдел внешних церковных связей. (DECR).

June in the Eastern Orthodox calendar